Jang Dong-lin (born 17 April 1968) is a South Korean biathlete. He competed in the men's 20 km individual event at the 1992 Winter Olympics.

References

1968 births
Living people
South Korean male biathletes
Olympic biathletes of South Korea
Biathletes at the 1992 Winter Olympics
Place of birth missing (living people)